Sumpalla was an ophthalmosaurid ichthyosaur from the Late Jurassic Vaca Muerta Formation of Argentina. It contained a single species, Sumpalla argentina. The holotype was initially believed to have belonged to Aegirosaurus before being placed in a new genus in 2021.

References 

Ophthalmosauridae
Monotypic prehistoric reptile genera
Jurassic Argentina
Jurassic reptiles of South America
Fossil taxa described in 2021